Mark Dapin (born 1963) is an Australian journalist, author, historian and screenwriter. He is best known for his long-running column in Good Weekend magazine.

Early life
Mark Dapin was born in Britain and immigrated to Australia in 1989.

Career
Dapin was the founding chief sub-editor of the Australian Financial Review Magazine in 1995. From 1998 to 2002, he was editor and then editor-in-chief of Ralph magazine. He has written for a variety of publications including The Sydney Morning Herald, The Guardian, The Times, Penthouse and Good Weekend. He has a Bachelor of Social Science degree and a Masters in Journalism from UTS and has taught journalism courses at the University of Sydney and Macleay College.

In 2008, Dapin was thrown out of celebrity chef Gordon Ramsay’s home when he was only minutes into a profile interview for Good Weekend magazine. The incident – and subsequent attempts by Ramsay’s publicists to control the story – formed the basis of Dapin’s feature ‘Nightmare on Ramsay Street’ and a later essay for the literary magazine Meanjin. Dapin’s work on Ramsay was examined in two essays in The Profiling Handbook: "What's the Point of a Profile? The Curious Cases of Mark Dapin on Gordon Ramsay and Jack Marx on Russell Crowe" by Fiona Giles, and "Double Vision: Profile of a Profile" by Gillian Rennie. Rennie, a lecturer at Rhodes University, South Africa, uses Dapin’s thoughts on the Ramsay interview as a prism for her own reflections on her famous profile of Epainette Mbeki. Giles, a professor at Sydney University, examines Dapin's work alongside that of his contemporary, Jack Marx. She writes: "both journalists are well-known, mid-career writers bringing a gonzo, rock 'n' roll sensibility to their work. Well-versed in the post-New Journalism style, they include themselves in their stories, and are entertainingly provocative. They enjoy a high status in Australia as award-winning writers, are known to court controversy, and have been sacked from Australia’s second largest print empire, Fairfax Media – occasions which attracted media coverage. They are both authors of book-length literary journalism in addition to feature-length profiles, and are admired for being independent thinkers with a quick wit."

Dapin’s departure in 2012 from Fairfax Media (to which he subsequently returned as a contributor) and the loss of his Good Weekend column, were reported extensively in the Australian press. In recent years, he has become more prominent as a novelist and historian. In July 2014 he was commissioned by the Centenary of Anzac Jewish Program to write a military history book Jewish Anzacs, published by the Sydney Jewish Museum. In July 2017 he was named as one of the screenwriters on the second season of TV show Wolf Creek – he is credited on two episodes of the show.

In 2019, he presented Myths of War on ABC radio.

Interviews
 The Sydney Morning Herald - "Mark Dapin, author of R&R, finds children and fiction are all that matters" by Susan Chenery

Awards and nominations
2010, Ned Kelly Awards, best first fiction, winner, King of the Cross
2012, Miles Franklin Award, longlist, Spirit House 
 2012, Age Book of the Year, shortlist, Spirit House
 2014, Royal Society of Literature’s Ondaatje Prize, shortlist, Spirit House
 2015, 'The Nib': CAL Waverley Library Award for Literature — Alex Buzo Shortlist Prize, winner, The Nashos' War
 2015, 'The Nib': CAL Waverley Library Award for Literature — People's Choice Award, winner, The Nashos' War
 2016, New South Wales Premier's Literary Awards — Douglas Stewart Prize for Non-fiction, shortlist, The Nashos' War
 2016, Ned Kelly Awards, best crime novel, shortlist, R&R
 2017, Mark and Evette Moran Nib Literary Award Military History Prize 2017, shortlisted, Jewish Anzacs
 2019, Nib Military History Prize, finalist, Australia's Vietnam

Bibliography

Books
Sex & Money: How I lived, breathed, read, wrote, loved, hated, dreamed and drank men's magazines (2004) 
Fridge Magnets are Bastards (2007) 
Strange Country (2008) 
King of the Cross (2009) 
Spirit House (2011) 
The Penguin Book of Australian War Writing (2011) 
From the Trenches: The best ANZAC writing of World War One (2013) 
The Nashos' War: Australia's national servicemen and Vietnam (2014) 
R&R (2015) 
Jewish Anzacs: Jews in the Australian Military (2017) 
Australia's Vietnam: Myth vs History (2019) 
Public Enemies (2020) Allen and Unwin

Short stories

Dapin, Mark (2018/19). "In the Court of the Lion King". Sydney Noir.

Memoir

Dapin, Mark (2012). "Confessions of a Columnist". Meanjin. 68 (1).

Essays and reporting

External links
 ABC profile

References

1963 births
Living people
Australian freelance journalists
British emigrants to Australia
Ned Kelly Award winners